The hospitality industry is a broad category of fields within the service industry that includes lodging, food and drink service, event planning, theme parks, travel and tourism. It includes hotels, tourism agencies, restaurants and bars.

Sectors
According to the Cambridge Business English Dictionary the "hospitality industry" consists of hotels and food service, equivalent to NAICS code 72, "Accommodation and Food Service".

Definition in the United States
In 2020, the United States Department of Labor Standard Industrial Classification (SIC) defines the hospitality industry more broadly, including:
 701 Hotels and Motels, including auto courts, bed and breakfast inns, cabins and cottages, casino hotels, hostels, hotels (except residential ones), inns furnishing food and lodging, motels, recreational hotels, resort hotels, seasonal hotels, ski lodges and resorts, tourist cabins and tourist courts

 704 Organization Hotels and Lodging Houses, On a Membership Basis
 58 Eating and Drinking Places (cf. U.S. "food service industry", U.K. "catering industry")
 5812 Eating Places, including restaurants (among which carry-out restaurants, drive-in restaurants and fast food restaurants), automats, beaneries, box lunch stands, buffets, cafés, cafeterias, caterers, coffee shops, commissary restaurants a.k.a. canteens, concession stands, prepared food (e.g., in airports and sports arenas), contract feeding,  dairy bars, diners, dining rooms, dinner theaters, food bars, frozen custard stands, grills, hamburger stands, hot dog stands, ice cream stands, industrial feeding, institutional food service such as that aboard airplanes, railroads, and ships), lunch bars, lunch counters, luncheonettes, lunchrooms, oyster bars, pizza parlors and pizzerias, refreshment stands, sandwich bars or shops, snack shops, soda fountains, soft drink stands, submarine sandwich shops, and tearooms. Sources other than the SIC also mention other formats of eating places such as cyber cafés, ramen shops a.k.a. noodle bars, and sushi bars.
 5813 Drinking Places (alcoholic beverages) including bars, beer gardens/parlors/taverns, sale of beer, wine, and liquors for on-premise consumption, bottle clubs, cabarets, cocktail lounges, discotheques, drinking places, nightclubs, saloons, taprooms, taverns, and wine bars
 472 Arrangement of Passenger Transportation
 4724 Travel Agencies
 4725 Tour Operators
 4729 Arrangement of Passenger Transportation, Not Elsewhere Classified, such as ticket offices not operated by transportation companies, and services that arrange carpools

In the United States, hotels are the most popular vacation accommodation. In 2022, the worth of US Hotels & Motels industry reached up to $177.6 billion.

Definition in Dutch, Italian and French
Horeca (also HoReCa, HORECA) is the Dutch, German, Italian, Romanian and French languages term for the food service and hotel industries. The term is a syllabic abbreviation of the words Hotel/Restaurant/Café. The term is mostly used in the Benelux countries and in Switzerland.

"Horeca" is often not a one-to-one equivalent to the term "hospitality industry" used in English, which is often used more broadly. According to the Cambridge Business English Dictionary the "hospitality industry" consists of hotels and food service, equivalent to NAICS code 72, "Accommodation and Food Service". However, the United States Department of Labor Standard Industry Classification (SIC) defines the hospitality industry more broadly, as noted above.

The Dutch Uniforme Voorwaarden Horeca (UVH) is translated into English as Uniform Conditions for the Hotel and Catering Industry. This code covers hotels, bars, restaurants and related businesses in the Netherlands. Koninklijke Horeca Nederland is the Dutch trade association for the hotel and catering industry.

This sector is one of the fastest growing in Europe. In 2004, more than 7.8 million people were employed and the sector generated more than $338 billion turnover. Jobs tend to be temporary, with irregular hours, low pay, and few career prospects. There is a high proportion of young people working in the sector. Some distribution companies use this term to define the food & beverage service trade channel or the hospitality trade.

See also

Destination marketing organization
Hospitality
 Hospitality industry in the United Kingdom
Hotel manager
Leisure industry
American Hotel & Lodging Educational Institute
Gastronomy

References

 
Tourism industry